Ragnhild Bente Andersen (born 31 March 1965) is a Norwegian orienteering competitor and World champion. She won a gold medal in relay at the 1987 World Orienteering Championships, together with Bratberg, Olsvik and Volden. She received a silver medal in relay in 1991, together with Sandstad, Arnesen and Bratberg.

Andersen won the overall Orienteering World Cup in 1990.

References

External links
 
 Ragnhild Bente Andersen at World of O Runners

1965 births
Living people
Norwegian orienteers
Female orienteers
Foot orienteers
World Orienteering Championships medalists
20th-century Norwegian women